Dorothy Grace Atkinson (née Gillis; 5 August 1929 – 23 January 2016) was an American historian who specialized in Russian history.

Personal life
Atkinson was of Scottish and Italian ancestry. Her father was a labor union leader, while her mother was a homemaker. She had six brothers.

Atkinson was the first in her family to attend college. Atkinson studied history at Barnard College and graduated in 1951. She and her husband, Stewart, then moved to California so Atkinson could obtain a graduate degree from the University of California, Berkeley. After obtaining the degree, Atkinson paused her career to raise two children. In 1971, she earned her Ph.D from Stanford University.

Career
Atkinson served as an assistant professor of Russian history at Stanford University from 1973 to 1982. One of her graduate students described Atkinson's teaching style as "engaged and engaging, demanding but kind (a rarity at Stanford at that time)". Another former student noted Atkinson's importance in breaking down barriers for young women in academia in the 1970s.

At Stanford, Atkinson was director of the university's Summer Institute for Soviet and East European Studies, holding that post from 1983 until 1986. The Stanford University Press published two of her books on Russian history, one of them a co-edited work with Alexander Dallin and Gail Warshofky. During her career, she also wrote dozens of journal articles, book chapters, and reviews.

From 1981 until her retirement in 1995, Atkinson served as executive director of the Association for Slavic, East European, and Eurasian Studies (ASEEES), taking control of a nearly bankrupt organization that had resulted from a decade of financial mismanagement. Under her leadership, the ASEEES achieved financial solvency, doubled its membership, and increased its international profile.

Publications
Adapted from:
  Co-edited with Alexander Dallin and Gail Warshofky

References

Works cited

 
 

1929 births
2016 deaths
People from Malden, Massachusetts
Barnard College alumni
American women historians
Historians from Massachusetts
20th-century American historians
21st-century American historians
UC Berkeley College of Letters and Science alumni
Stanford University alumni
Stanford University faculty
20th-century American women
21st-century American women